Keleti is the Hungarian word for east. It is used as a surname and then may refer to:

 Ágnes Keleti (born 1921), Hungarian-Israeli Olympic champion artistic gymnast
Márton Keleti (1905–1973), Hungarian film director
Gusztáv Kelety (1834–1902), Hungarian painter and art critic
György Keleti  (born 1946), Hungarian politician

See also
Budapest Keleti railway station, the east station, the largest among the three main railway stations in Budapest
Keleti pályaudvar (Budapest Metro), station of the M2 (East-West) line of the Budapest Metro